Siamlema is a small genus of southeast Asian long-legged cave spiders. It was first described by H. F. Zhao, S. Q. Li and A. B. Zhang in 2020, and it has only been found in Thailand.  it contains only two species: S. changhai and S. suea.

See also
 List of Telemidae species

References

Telemidae genera
Arthropods of Thailand